The Smiley Company is a brand licensing company, based in London, United Kingdom. It holds the rights to the smiley face in over 100 countries. The company creates products including textiles, puzzles, party goods, stationery, automobile accessories, and toys for licensed brand partners and retailers.

History

Franklin Loufrani worked as a journalist in France during the 1960s and 70s. While working for the newspaper France-Soir, he was tasked with creating a new segment in the paper, focused on good news. Loufrani decided that the segment should focus on good news stories, but also needed a design to draw readers attention to the new section. The concept he came up with was a smiling face, to be used as part of the logo, replacing the "o" in France-Soir. The logo with the new smiley and subsequent good news segment were first used in the newspaper on January 1, 1972, and was accompanied with the slogan, "Take The Time To Smile." According to recent publications from France-Soir, the new "good news" section was a huge success and caused other European-based newspapers to follow the trend.

While the Loufrani-designed smiley first appeared in print in 1972, he had foreseen its potential and taken the design to the French trademark office in October 1971 and begun the process of trademarking the design in France. While licensing in the United States was becoming an increasingly popular commercial venture, in Europe it was still quite rare to see companies specialise in nothing but licensing. After Loufrani's trademark was copyrighted, he quit his job as a journalist and began to look into options of how to commercialise the trademark. France at the time was dealing with the aftermath of numerous civil movements, including May 68 which began with student protests. Loufrani used this as an opportunity to increase awareness of the smiley and gave away stickers to French university students initially. The stickers became an overnight cultural success, appearing all over the country on lampposts and car bumpers. It spread from university students to the general public, with Loufrani giving away 10 million in total.

Its success meant brands were more interested in working with the smiley as part of one-off campaigns. In the mid-1970s, came Loufrani's first major deal. The forerunner to M&M's in Europe were known as Bonitos, with Loufrani agreeing a deal for smiley's to be printed on the front of the chocolates. Other large corporations began to deal with Loufrani, including Levi's who were the first fashion brand to use a smiley on its jeans in the 1970s.

While other smiling faces had been used in marketing and advertising elsewhere globally, many of them used terms such as "happy face" and "smiling face." Loufrani was the first documented person to use the term "smiley." By the 1990s, Franklin and his son Nicolas Loufrani held trademarks for the symbol in around 70 countries and had licensed the smiley to brands including Levi Strauss & Co. In 1996, the Loufranis founded the Smiley Company in London, England, built around the Smiley brand.  In 1997, Nicolas created hundreds of emoticons, including a 3D smiley logo. His images, registered with the United States Copyright Office in 1997, were first published as GIF files on the internet in 1998, making them the first graphical emoticons used in technology. He launched the SmileyWorld brand shortly thereafter. In the early 2000s, the company licensed the rights to their emoticons to telecom companies, including Nokia, Motorola, Samsung, amongst others. Nicolas Loufrani compiled his graphical emoticons, along with other existing images used for communication, into an online dictionary which was divided into categories, and by 2002, the dictionary included over 3,000 images.

In 1997, The Smiley Company filed a trademark application with the United States Patent and Trademark Office. In 2001, Walmart opposed the registration, citing potential confusion between their design and Loufrani's. Nine years later, the USPTO initially sided with Walmart, before another federal court case was brought forward by Smiley in 2009. In 2011, the companies settled out of court.

In 2005, the company announced the creation of the Smiley World Association, later renamed Smiley Fund and now Smiley Movement, as a charitable arm of the company, to which it donates 10 percent of its profits. In 2017, the company was responsible for 210 million products, that were sold under partnership and licensing agreements.

License Global magazine listed the company as one of the most influential brands of the 2010s in its December 2020 summary of the brands of the decade list. In early 2021, it was announced that The Smiley Company had produced a short film about the history of the Smiley in the run-up to the 50th anniversary since it was created by Franklin Loufrani.

Fashion
In 2007, The Smiley Company setup a design studio in London. The company worked with a number of fashion houses from 2007 onwards, including the Moschino campaign, “Smiley for Moschino.” In 2017, Smiley partnered with Crocs to create Smiley Jibbitz, charms which could be worn on Crocs. They partnered again in 2021 with a smiley designed croc shoe.

By 2022, the fashion division of Smiley Company generated €200 million in sales annually.

Business model
The Smiley Company's business model was compared to Peter Drucker's theory that corporations could operate with a small team of senior management, with partnerships and outsourcing a major component when bringing products to market. In the book, The Michelangelo Project: Making It in the Digital Century Workforce, author Isabel Wu explained that The Smiley Company deployed a real-world example of Drucker's business theory. Its vast library of images, designs and concepts are then used by other companies to develop and manufacture products.

References

External links
 The Smiley Company official website

Branding companies of the United Kingdom
Privately held companies of the United Kingdom